The following is a list of films and television shows about the American Civil War from the beginning of the 20th century until present.

Films about the war

Before 1920

The Guerrilla (1908)
The Fugitive (1910)
The House with Closed Shutters (1910)
In the Border States (1910)
The Battle (1911), directed by D.W. Griffith
His Trust Fulfilled (1911)
Railroad Raiders of '62 (1911)
Swords and Hearts (1911)
For Her Sake (1911)
Curfew Shall Not Ring Tonight (1912)
The Informer (1912)
The Lie (1912)
The Seventh Son (1912)
The Battle of Gettysburg (1913)
The Battle of Shiloh (1913)
The Price of Victory (1913)
The Seed of the Fathers (1913)
Dan (1914)
The Sleeping Sentinel (1914)
The Birth of a Nation (1915), also known as The Clansmen, directed by D.W. Griffith, quite possibly the most infamous civil war film ever made.
The Warrens of Virginia (1915)
Colonel Carter of Cartersville (1915)
The Coward (1915)
According to the Code (1916)
Her Father's Son (1916)
Naked Hearts (1916)
The Sting of Victory (1916)
The Blood of His Fathers (1917)
The Field of Honor (1917)
The Lincoln Cycle (1917)
The Spreading Dawn (1917)
Hearts of Love (1918)
The Scarlet Drop (1918)
The Son of Democracy (1918)
Miss Dulcie from Dixie (1918)
Hay Foot, Straw Foot (1919)

1920s

The Copperhead (1920)
Grandma's Boy (1922)
Barbara Frietchie (1924)
The Dramatic Life of Abraham Lincoln (1924)
Hands Up! (1926)
The General (1926), film by Buster Keaton about the Great Locomotive Chase
Court Martial (1928)
The Overland Telegraph (1929)

1930s
Abraham Lincoln (1930), a biopic about President Abraham Lincoln
Secret Service (1931)
Little Women (1933) 
Operator 13 (1934)
So Red the Rose (1935) 
The Littlest Rebel (1935)
Hearts in Bondage (1936)
General Spanky (1936)
The Old Maid (1939)
Gone with the Wind (1939), perhaps the most famous Civil War film

1940s
The Man from Dakota (1940)
Virginia City (1940)
Dark Command (1940)
They Died With Their Boots On (1941), a biopic about General George Custer
Tennessee Johnson (1942), a biopic about President Andrew Johnson
The Adventures of Mark Twain (1944), a biopic about Mark Twain
Renegade Girl (1946) 
Silver River (1948)
 Tap Roots (1948),  very loosely based on the true life story of Newton Knight
A Southern Yankee (1948) 
The Man from Colorado (1949)
Little Women (1949)
South of St. Louis (1949)

1950s
Two Flags West (1950)
Rocky Mountain (1950)
Drums in the Deep South (1951)
The Last Outpost (1951)
The Red Badge of Courage (1951)
Springfield Rifle (1952)
Escape from Fort Bravo (1953)
The Raid (1954), loosely based on the St. Albans Raid
The Great Locomotive Chase (1956), based on the Great Locomotive Chase 
Love Me Tender (1956)
Friendly Persuasion (1956)
Revolt at Fort Laramie (1957)
Band of Angels (1957)
Raintree County (1957)
The Horse Soldiers (1959), based on the Grierson's Raid in the Vicksburg Campaign and the Battle of Newton's Station

1960s

Mysterious Island (1961)
How the West Was Won (1962)
Advance to the Rear (1964)
Major Dundee (1965)
Shenandoah (1965)
Alvarez Kelly (1966)
The Good, the Bad and the Ugly (1966), western, directed by Sergio Leone and starring Clint Eastwood, that involves an encounter with both Union and Confederate forces
A Time for Killing (1967)
Journey to Shiloh (1968)

1970s

Rio Lobo (1970)
The Beguiled (1971)
The Red Badge of Courage (TV) (1974) 
The Outlaw Josey Wales (1976), Clint Eastwood film about guerrilla warfare in Missouri
The Lincoln Conspiracy (1977)
Love's Savage Fury (1979)

1980s and 1990s

The Shadow Riders (1982) made for television film, starring Tom Selleck and Sam Elliott
Glory (1989), drama, starring Matthew Broderick and Denzel Washington, about the African-American 54th Massachusetts Volunteer Infantry
Dances With Wolves (1990)
Ironclads (1991), made-for-TV drama about the ironclad warships CSS Virginia and the USS Monitor, which clashed at the Battle of Hampton Roads
Sommersby (1993)
Ghost Brigade (1993)
Gettysburg (1993), war film featuring Tom Berenger and Jeff Daniels about the Battle of Gettysburg
Pharaoh's Army (1995)
Andersonville (TV) (1996)
Amistad (1997), features a brief shot of the war at the end of the film
The Hunley (TV) (1999), film about the Confederate submarine H. L. Hunley
Ride with the Devil (1999), Ang Lee film about the guerrilla battles in Kansas and Missouri between the jayhawkers and the bushwhackers

2000s

Wicked Spring (2002)
Gangs of New York (2002), drama, starring Leonardo DiCaprio, about the New York Draft Riots
Gods and Generals (2003), prequel to Gettysburg and covers the battles of First Bull Run, Fredericksburg, and Chancellorsville
Cold Mountain (2003), drama, starring Jude Law and Nicole Kidman, that features the Battle of the Crater and aftermath of the war
C.S.A.: The Confederate States of America (2004), alternative history film which speculates what would happen had the South won the Civil War
Dead Birds (2004)
The Colt (TV) (2005), drama, starring Ryan Merriman, features Battle of the Wilderness
Mysterious Island (TV) (2005)
The Last Confederate: The Story of Robert Adams (2007)
Dog Jack (2009)

2010s
The Conspirator (2010)
Abraham Lincoln vs. Zombies (2012)
Abraham Lincoln: Vampire Hunter (2012)
Lincoln (2012), starring Daniel Day-Lewis, covering the last few months of the war
Saving Lincoln (2013), about Ward Hill Lamon who was Lincoln's bodyguard
Killing Lincoln (TV) (2013)
Copperhead (2013)
Field of Lost Shoes (2014)
Army of Frankensteins (2014)
The Keeping Room (2014)
Free State of Jones (2016)
The Beguiled (2017)
Little Women (2019)

Television shows and miniseries
The Twilight Zone (1959–1964), had a few episodes that dealt with the Civil War:
 The Passersby (1961)
 Still Valley (1961)
 An Occurrence at Owl Creek Bridge (1964) 
The Americans (1961), TV series
The Blue and the Gray (1982), miniseries, starring John Hammond, Stacy Keach, Lloyd Bridges, and Gregory Peck as President Abraham Lincoln
North and South (1985 – 1986/1994), miniseries, starring Patrick Swayze, James Read and Lesley-Anne Down
The Rose and the Jackal (1990) Civil War Spy drama starring Christopher Reeve as Allan Pinkerton and Madolyn Smith as Rose Greenhow
True Blood (2008–2014), one of the main protagonists of the show vampire Bill Compton is a former Confederate soldier and some flashbacks are set specifically in the Civil War.
Hell on Wheels (2011–2016), protagonist of the show is an ex-Confederate soldier veteran.
Copper (2012–2013) - portrays the 1864 Election Day sabotage
Grant (2020), miniseries, depicts the life of Ulysses Grant, with a large portion covering the Civil War.
The Good Lord Bird (2020), miniseries, depicts John Brown's raid on Harpers Ferry on the Federal Armory at Harpers Ferry, Virginia, which instigated the events that started the American Civil War.

Documentaries
The Battle of Gettysburg (1955)
The Civil War by Ken Burns (first broadcast on PBS from September 23 to Thursday, September 27, 1990)
The Great Battles of the Civil War (TV series 1994)
Sherman's March (1986)
Civil War Combat (TV Series 2000-2003)
Gettysburg: 3 days of Destiny (2004)
10 Days That Unexpectedly Changed Women (2006), TV, recounting the Battle of Antietam
Lincoln and Lee at Antietam: The Cost of Freedom (2006)
The End of the Civil War (2009,  History Channel): a collection of four separately produced and aired films sold as a single title: Sherman's March (2007), April 1865 (2003), The Hunt for John Wilkes Booth (2007), and Stealing Lincoln's Body (2009). The collection is also known as The Last Days of the Civil War.
Gettysburg (broadcast on History in 2011)

References

+
 
Lists of films and television series